Hitler: A Study in Tyranny is a 1952 biography of the Nazi dictator Adolf Hitler by British historian Alan Bullock. It was the first comprehensive biography of Hitler. A revised version was published in 1962.

Reception
In 1992, The New York Times wrote that it "remains the standard biography of the dictator and a widely respected work on the Nazi movement in general". In 1998, the Hitler expert Ian Kershaw described the book as a "masterpiece". In his 2007 book Cultural Amnesia, the critic Clive James wrote, "Books about Hitler are without number, but after more than 60 years, the first one to read is still Alan Bullock's Hitler A Study in Tyranny".

See also
List of books by or about Adolf Hitler
Psychopathography of Adolf Hitler

References

External links
 Hitler: A Study in Tyranny (1952 edition)

1952 non-fiction books
Books about Adolf Hitler
Books by Alan Bullock
English-language books
English non-fiction books
Odhams Press books